József is a Hungarian masculine given name. It is the Hungarian name equivalent to Joseph.

Notable people bearing this name include:

 József Braun (also known as József Barna; 1901–1943), Hungarian Olympic footballer 
 József Csermák (1932–2001), Hungarian hammer thrower and 1952 Olympic champion
 József Darányi (1905–1990), Hungarian shot putter
 József Deme (born 1951), Hungarian sprint canoer
Baron József Eötvös de Vásárosnamény (1813–1871) was a Hungarian writer and statesman, Minister of Education of Hungary
 József Farkas de Boldogfa (1857–1951) was a Hungarian nobleman, jurist, landowner, politician, Member of the Hungarian Parliament
 József Garami (born 1939), Hungarian football manager and former player
 József Gráf (born 1946), Hungarian engineer and politician
 József Györe (1902–1985), Hungarian communist politician, Interior Minister between 1952 and 1953
 József Háda (1911–1994), Hungarian football goalkeeper
 József Horváth (disambiguation)
 József Kanta (born 1984), Hungarian footballer
 József Kasza (born 1945), ethnic Hungarian Serbian politician, economist and banker, Deputy Prime Minister of Serbia (2001-2004)
 József Kovács (disambiguation)
 József Kristóffy (1857–1928), Hungarian politician, Interior Minister between 1905 and 1906
 József Künsztler (1897–1951), Hungarian footballer and manager
 József Madarász (1814–1915), Hungarian lawyer and politician
 József Mészáros (1923–1997), Hungarian footballer and manager
 József Moravetz (1911–1990), Romanian footballer
 József Munk, Hungarian Olympic medalist swimmer
 József Nagy (disambiguation), various Hungarian athletes
 József Pálinkás (born 1952), Hungarian atomic physicist and politician, Minister of Education between 2001 and 2002
 József Rády (1884–1957), Hungarian fencer
 József Remecz (1907–1989), Hungarian discus thrower
 József Sir (1912–1996), Hungarian sprinter
 József Szlávy (1818–1900), Hungarian politician, Prime Minister of Hungary from 1872 to 1874
 József Szabó (born 1969), Hungarian retired swimmer and 1988 Olympic champion
 József Szájer (born 1961), Hungarian politician
 József Széll (1880–1956), Hungarian politician, Interior Minister between 1937 and 1938
 József Tóth (disambiguation)
 József Varga (disambiguation)
 József Várszegi (1910–1977), Hungarian javelin thrower
 József Vida (born 1963), Hungarian hammer thrower
 József Viola (1896–1949), Hungarian football player and coach, also known as Giuseppe Viola in Italy

See also
 Joseph
 Josef
 Jozef

Masculine given names
Hungarian masculine given names